Duck Reach Power Station was the first publicly owned hydro-electric plant in the Southern Hemisphere, and provided the Tasmanian city of Launceston with hydro-electric power from its construction in 1895 to its closure in 1955.

Construction
The site was picked by Launceston city surveyor and engineer Charles St John David in 1892.

The penstock ran diagonally down the hill into the centre of the rear of the power station where it channeled in to successively smaller pipes and finally to eight Siemens turbines.

Drilling the tunnel
The tunnel was cut through the hill side instead of being piped around and it took 16 months to complete using pneumatic drills. Dolerite is so hard it took one week of eighteen 8-hour shifts cutting from both ends of the tunnel to cut just  however the average speed of the drilling was about  a week.
Two men were killed in accidents. When both ends met it was found that the accuracy was within 1 inch.

Operational history

The Duck Reach Power Station first operated on a trial basis on the evening of the 10th of December 1895, when it was used to illuminate some of Launceston's streets using arc lights.  On the 1st of February 1896, the hydro-electric power system was officially switched on, remaining in operation until 1955.

The following is paraphrased from the display plaques now within the power station:

Originally the installation had a capacity of 75 kW DC, provided by five 15 kW dynamos, and 360 kW AC, provided by three 120 kW 92 c.p.s. alternators. The turbines were manufactured by Gilbert Gilkes and Co., Kendal, whilst the dynamos and alternators were built by Siemens Bros. and Co.. All of the alternating-current (AC) supply was single-phase. Towards the end of the 1890's more power was required and in 1898/9 two additional 120 kW 92 c.p.s. alternators were installed.  By the early 1900's the demand was still rising and again it became necessary to further upgrade the plant. This was achieved by removing much of the original equipment and replacing it with four horizontal shaft 445 hp Francis turbines manufactured by Kolben and Co. of Prague, each coupled to a single 300 kW three-phase 50 c.p.s. alternator again built by Siemens Bros. and Co.. This raised the AC capacity of the station to 1.2 MW. The original DC equipment remained in use.

Again by circa 1915, this had become inadequate, and to ease the problem a new  turbine coupled to an American 800 kW alternator was added alongside the existing machinery at the eastern end of the machine hall in 1921/2. To drive this new turbine a timber flume and a masonry aqueduct was constructed, running from Deadman's Hollow around the bend in the South Esk River to the slope immediately behind the Power Station, where it was led into a new steel penstock running alongside the original one. In the photograph above, the left-hand penstock is the newer one.

One of the original Siemens Bros. and Co. 15 kW DC dynamos, dating from 1895, direct coupled to a dynamo, is preserved and on display in the far end of the station.

The power station was taken over by the Hydro-Electric Commission in 1945, and decommissioned in 1955, following the construction of the Trevallyn Dam and power station.

Duck Reach Museum
The suggestion to create a museum at Duck Reach was first mooted in December 1956 in a letter to the editor of Examiner by Mr Michael Sharland of Hobart.  In his  letter of 17 December 1956 he suggested that the Duck Reach Power Station, with state  backing of the Launceston  City  Council,  be established as a technological museum. Mr Sharland at that time was Secretary of the Scenery Preservation Board and an authority on early Tasmanian buildings.

The Mayor of Launceston, Alderman Edwards, supported the idea saying that only a little money would be needed to convert the station.  At that time the station was kept in good order by three men even though the station had been closed for some time.  In fact one of the six generators was kept in good order to light the building and office.

Later that month, in another letter Mr A.R. Evershed of Launceston endorsed Mr Sharland’s letter stating that ‘probably the original plant was the first, or one of the first high  tension alternating current hydroelectric plants for long transmission in the world’  and that ‘it would certainly be a crime to destroy such interesting historical matter’.

In late March 1957 the state Hydro Electric Commission offered the station to the Launceston City Council stating that ‘if it is left unattended it will soon deteriorate and  Launceston will lose a unique beauty spot which attracts thousands of people each year’. The Scenery Preservation Board at the time was prepared to donate old machinery for exhibits.

The Director of the Queen Victoria Museum was  asked by the council to report on the matter.  The Director of the museum recommended to council to decline the offer saying that ‘somehow I can’t help but feel that it is a little unfair to suggest that the council would be to blame if these buildings and bridge were demolished. After all the Hydro  owns them and has used them and surely it is the responsibility of the Hydro Electric Commission or the Scenery Preservation Board  to preserve these government assets’.  It seems he was very unenthusiastic.

Some twenty years later the ‘Launceston National Conservation Study’ suggested that  the building could be used as a museum of industrial archaeology related to its history.

In the study ‘Conservation in Practice’ by Lionel Morrell 1979, it is suggested that the  building be used as a tourist attraction or restaurant.

In the ‘Riveredge Study’ by Donald Goldsworthy 1980, it is suggested that:

a) the power station be rehabilitated

b) the suspension bridge be reconstructed

c) the stone cottages be re-evaluated

d) the site be developed and that the Trevallyn State Recreational Area be improved.

In 1982, in the study 'Duck Reach and the Electric Light, Launceston' by Mark Kozakiewicz 1982, the following suggestions were investigated:

1) The reuse of the Duck Reach Power Station as a museum of early Tasmanian hydro electric power development.

2) The rehabilitation of the old suspension bridge to link the two sides of the South Esk River.

3) The reuse of the engineers' cottages for support services.

4) The establishment of walks from the power station.

5) Examine the possibilities for relating the activities of the Trevallyn State Recreational Reserve to activities at the power station.

In the ‘Cliff Grounds Reserve Interim Management Plan’ 1982 by the Launceston City Council Parks and Recreation Department, recommendations were made similar to those made in the ‘Riveredge Study’.

In 1995 on the centenary of its first opening, the power station was made weatherproof, the suspension bridge restored and the building re-opened as a museum.
It  would be an understatement to suggest that this has been a favourite discussion point in  Launceston for longer than many would like   to remember as a possible solution to clear some of the silt in Home Reach where the Esk  Rivers meet to form the Tamar River.

In March 2012 the Launceston City Council voted in favour of investigating the redevelopment of the historic Duck Reach power station for power generation with initial interest from Hydro Tasmania.

See also

Renewable energy
Environmental concerns with electricity generation

References

 Hydro Tasmania; South Esk Power Development, Accessed June 2006.

Kozakiewicz, Mark  Andrew (Autumn and Winter 1982), Duck Reach and the Electric Light, Launceston, A major project submission, Bachelor of Arts in Environmental Design Tasmanian College of Advanced Education, Launceston.

External links
Duck Reach Museum
Launceston Cataract Gorge & First Basin
Parks & Wildlife Service, Tasmania - Short Walks, Duck Reach

Energy infrastructure completed in 1895
Tourist attractions in Tasmania
Hydroelectric power stations in Tasmania
Recipients of Engineers Australia engineering heritage markers
Economic history of Tasmania